The North Korea women's national basketball team is the nationally controlled basketball team representing North Korea at international basketball competitions for women. It is administered by the Amateur Basketball Association of DPR of Korea.

Asian championship
North Korea played in five Asian championships, most recently participating at the 2017 FIBA Asia Women's Cup.

Current squad
Roster for the 2017 FIBA Women's Asia Cup.

See also

North Korea women's national under-19 basketball team

References

External links
FIBA profile
North Korea Basketball Records at FIBA Archive

Basketball in North Korea
Basketball teams in North Korea
Women's national basketball teams
1947 establishments in North Korea
B